Sanath Wimalasiri (සනත් විමලසිරි [Sinhala]) is an actor in Sri Lankan cinema, theater and television. Highly versatile actor from drama to comedy, Wimalasiri is also a talented singer and a television host.

Personal life
He was born in 1974-o4-08 in matale. His parents Mr Jhonney Wimalasiri and Mrs Prema Thalgahagoda are retired aesthetic teacher instructors. His brother, Mahinda Wimalasiri is a senior lecturer in the University of Visual arts. Mr Mahinda also involved in drama. Sanath completed education from Weuda Central College,Kurunegala. D.M.Gunarathna Maha Vidyalaya, matale<  St. Thomas' College, Matale and Kingswood College, Kandy. He is married to Vineetha Erandathi. The couple has two daughters. Vineetha is also a teacher works at Sri Jayewardenepura Balika Vidyalaya.

Acting career
He started to act in stage dramas while studying at Kingswood College. He first stage acting came through the play Kethumathi produced by Upali Thilanka Hewage. Under the guidance of his teacher Amitha Rabbidigala, Wimalasiri joined Ediriweera Sarachchandra’s theater group. He was selected to play the lead roles in Sarachchandra's critically acclaimed plays such as Maname and Sinhabahu. In 1996, his acted in the serial Nedayo directed by Nalan Mendis, which marked his entrance to television serials. His maiden cinema acting came through 2003 film Sonduru Dadabima directed by Anura Horatious. His most notable acting came through comedy film Sri Last Chance.

He hosted the television programs Potawe Isakkaluwa telecast on TV One.and Sanath Ekka Jeewitheta Idadenna.

Selected stage dramas

 Kethumathi
 Promitheous
 Raja Jalliya
 Dummala Warama
 Hasthikantha Manthare
 Maname
Mandela Mandela 
 Oba Sapekshai
 Last Bus Eke Kathawa
 Raththaran
 Elowa Gihin Melowa Aawa
 Kada Walalu
 Lomahansa
 Bhawa Kadathurawa
 Asammathaya
 Kunu Kanuwak Saha Nommara Dekak
 Sihala Wansala
 Ayu Kal
 Prathiroopa
 Guru Tharuwa
 Sudu Redi Hora
 Dall's House
 Pematho Jayathi Soko
 Nil Rosa Mala'
 Samath Api Asamath'
 Lysistrata
 Makarata
 Raja Man Wahala
 Rathnawali
 Sinhabahu

Selected television serials

 Amarabandu Rupasinghe
 Asani Wesi
 Bhavathra
 Bonikko
 Bopath Ella
 Chandi Kumarihami
 Chaya
 Crime Scene
 Dedunu Sihina
 Divithura
 Diya Yata Gini
 Diya Sithuvam 
 Eka Kusa Upan Ewun
 Eth Kanda Lihini
 Gimhana Tharanaya 
 Girikula
 Googly  
 Heeye Manaya 
 Hiru Daruwo
 Hummanaya
 Imaka Pema
 Ingammaaruwa
 Ithin Eta Passe
 Kekiri
 Lansupathiniyo
 Maada Eyama Wiya
 Maddahana  
 Maha Polowa  
 Mama Nemei Mama 
 Manikkawatha 
 Mudawapu Kirilli
 Muthu Pihatu
 Nedeyo
 Onna Ohe Menna Mehe
 Paradeesaya 
 Pingala Danawwa
 Piya Geta Pela
 Pork Veediya 
 Ran Mehesi 
 Raththarana Neth
 Ridee Siththam
 Sakala Vikala
 Samartha
 Sathi Pooja
 Shoba 
 Sihina Piyapath
 Situ Gedara
 Star Sri Lanka Histhanak
 Subha Prarthana
 Suddilage Kathawa 
 Sura Pura Sara 
 Swarnapalee
 Thalaya Soyana Geethaya
 Tharupaba
 Thuththiri
 Viyali

Beyond acting
Initially he worked as the dance teacher in D. S. Senanayake College. Currently, he is a teacher of drama and theater at Rahula Girls' School, Malabe. He is also attached to the Sri Jayewardenepura Zonal Education Office as an Assistant Lecturer. He is also an external lecturer at the Faculty of Education, University of Colombo, lecturer in law at the National Institute of Law and in addition to being a consultant in manpower.

Filmography

Awards
In 1997, Wimalasiri won the award for the Best Actor in Youth Awards Festival and State Drama Festival in 1998. He won the award for the Best Upcoming actor for the role in Rejina at Sumathi Awards. Then, he won the Silver Award for Asani Wesi at SIGNIS awards.

State Drama Festival

|-
||1997 ||| Oba Sapekshai   || Best Actor ||  |||

||1998 ||| Asammathaya     || Best Actor || 

||2016 ||| Raja Man Wahala || Best Actor ||

References

External links
 President, chief gust at Uthamabhivandana Ranga Pelahara
 ආදරය කරපු තරුණියෝ මදුරු කොයිල් දෙන්න එහෙම කතා කරන්නේ නැද්ද?
 Chat with Sanath Wimalasiri
 Meat to please the palate
 Kandy vibes a memorable show
 Rhythm of Dreams

Sri Lankan male film actors
Living people
Sinhalese male actors
1974 births